La casa del odio, is a Mexican telenovela that aired on  Canal 4, Telesistema Mexicano in 1960. Produced by Ernesto Alonso and starring Carmen Montejo and Rafael Banquells.

Cast 

 Carmen Montejo 
 Rafael Banquells
 Tony Carbajal
 Dalia Iñiguez
 Patricia Morán
 Rafael Llamas
 Eduardo Fajardo

References 

1960 telenovelas
Mexican telenovelas
Televisa telenovelas
Television shows set in Mexico City
1960 Mexican television series debuts
1960 Mexican television series endings
Spanish-language telenovelas